The Fifth Floor is a 1978 American film about a sane woman who gets sent to an asylum. It stars Dianne Hull, Bo Hopkins and Mel Ferrer.

Plot
The film focuses on Kelly McIntyre, a disco dancer played by Dianne Hull who through no fault of her own accidentally overdoses on drugs and collapses at a disco. She is misdiagnosed as suicidal and sent to a psychiatric ward which is on the fifth floor of Cedar Springs Hospital.<ref>Evening Independent May 27, 1980 [https://news.google.com/newspapers?nid=950&dat=19800527&id=a2FQAAAAIBAJ&sjid=k1gDAAAAIBAJ&pg=6220,3119148 The Fifth Floor: Pure Exploitation by Jim Moorhead Entertainment Writer]</ref> There she finds herself alone with no help, not even from her boyfriend who refuses to get her out of there. She becomes the subject of interest by an unbalanced orderly played by Bo Hopkins.

Cathey Paine, who played the part of Leslie Van Houten in Helter Skelter'' (1976), Robert Englund and Michael Berryman who are familiar to horror fans also play parts in the film.
Singer Pattie Brooks also makes an appearance in the film as a disco singer.

Cast

References

External links
 The Fifth Floor at Cult Film Freaks
 
 

1978 films
1970s thriller films
American thriller films
Films scored by Alan Silvestri
Films set in psychiatric hospitals
1970s English-language films
1970s American films